The Tesla master plan is the business plan released by American electric vehicle and clean energy company Tesla, Inc. The plan was first introduced in 2006, and updated in 2016 and 2023.

Part one (2006) 
On August 2, 2006, it appeared as it appeared on the company website.  Summarized thus:
 Build sports car
 Use that money to build an affordable car
 Use that money to build an even more affordable car
 While doing above, also provide zero emission electric power generation options

Landfill-safe batteries 
And which can be sold to recycling companies at the end of its 100,000 mile design life.

Lowest Power plan emissions

Co-marketing photovoltaic cells 
from SolarCity, of which he is the principal financier.  Generate enough energy for ~50 miles / day, allowing one who drives under 350 miles / week to become "carbon-negative" even push energy back onto the grid.

Part deux (2016) 
The plan was updated in 2016. "By definition, we must at some point achieve a sustainable energy economy or we will run out of fossil fuels to burn and civilization will collapse."Bloomberg observes in July 2022 that although Tesla has become the world's most valuable car company, by a wide margin, since the plan was released, the company has fallen short or completely missed its original four goals.

Part three (2023) 
Was announced in March 2022. In a company meeting in June 2022, Musk summarized:That’s what Master Plan Part 3 is: How do you get to enough scale to actually shift the entire energy infrastructure of earth?Revealed at his annual investor day on March 1.  Musk said: “There is a clear path to a sustainable-energy Earth. It doesn’t require destroying natural habitats. It doesn’t require us to be austere and stop using electricity and be in the cold or anything.” He added, “In fact, you could support a civilization much bigger than Earth, much more than the 8 billion humans could actually be supported sustainably on Earth.”

References

External links 
 The Secret Tesla Motors Master Plan (just between you and me) – Tesla, Inc.
 Master Plan, Part Deux – Tesla, Inc.